"Can't Take a Joke" is a song by Canadian rapper Drake from his album, Scorpion (2018), the song has reached the top 20 in Canada and the United States.

Commercial performance

North America
On July 14, 2018, "Can't Take a Joke" entered the charts at number 16 on the Billboard Canadian Hot 100 and remained in the top 100 until August 4, 2018. The song spent four weeks on the US Billboard Hot 100, entering the charts at number 18, its immediate peak, on July 14, 2018.

Internationally
The song has peaked in the top 40 in Australia, Portugal and has charted on the charts of France, Greece, the Netherlands, Slovakia, and Sweden.

Charts

Certifications

References

2018 songs
Drake (musician) songs
Songs written by Drake (musician)